Bernhard Schätzle (born 24 July 1954 in Freiburg im Breisgau) is a German politician, representative of the German Christian Democratic Union and member of the Baden-Württemberg state parliament since 2006.

Schätzle founded his vineyard in 1977 out of a small farm. This farm has belonged to his family for more than seven generations. He is married and has four children.

See also
List of German Christian Democratic Union politicians

References

External links
 Christlich Demokratische Union Deutschlands web site

Christian Democratic Union of Germany politicians
1954 births
Living people
Members of the Landtag of Baden-Württemberg
Politicians from Freiburg im Breisgau
German winemakers